Gampaha District ( gampaha distrikkaya,  Kampakai Māvaṭṭam) is one of the 25 districts of Sri Lanka, the second level administrative division of the country.  It is the second most populous district of Sri Lanka after Colombo District. The district is administered by a District Secretariat headed by a District Secretary (previously known as a Government Agent) appointed by the central government of Sri Lanka. The capital of the district is the town of Gampaha. The district was carved out of the northern part of Colombo District in September 1978.

Geographical Nature  
It is bounded by Kurunegala and Puttalam districts from north, Kegalle District from east, Colombo District from south and by the Indian Ocean from west. The borders of the district are the Ma Oya on the north, Kelani River on the south and 1,000 ft contour line on the east.

Administrative units
Gampaha District is divided into 13 Divisional Secretary's Division (DS Divisions), each headed by a Divisional Secretary (previously known as an Assistant Government Agent). The DS Divisions are further sub-divided into 1,177 Grama Niladhari Divisions (GN Divisions).

Demographics

Population
Gampaha District's population was 2,294,641 in 2012. The majority of the population are Sinhalese, with a minority Sri Lankan Moor and Sri Lankan Tamil population.

Ethnicity

Religion

Notes

References

External links

 Gampaha District Secretariat

 
1978 establishments in Sri Lanka
Districts of Sri Lanka